Lieutenant-Colonel Sir John Gibb Thom DSO MC (1 August 1891 – 19 February 1941) was a British soldier, judge and politician from Linlithgow.

Thom served with the Gordon Highlanders, and was awarded the Military Cross in 1917, and later that year received the Distinguished Service Order for "conspicuous gallantry and devotion to duty".

He was elected as a Member of Parliament for Dunbartonshire in 1926, losing the 1929 election but returning to office in 1931, where he stayed until resigning a year later.

In 1937 he was knighted as part of the New Years Honours, and was also made Chief Justice of the High Court of Judicature in Allahabad, a position he held until his death in 1941, aged 49.

References

External links 
 

1891 births
1941 deaths
Companions of the Distinguished Service Order
Knights Bachelor
Members of the Parliament of the United Kingdom for Scottish constituencies
Recipients of the Military Cross
UK MPs 1924–1929
UK MPs 1931–1935
Gordon Highlanders officers
British Army personnel of World War I